"Slipping Away" is a song by the English alternative rock band Mansun. The song was written by band-leader Paul Draper. It was recorded and produced by Richard Rainey and Paul Draper during sessions for the group's aborted-fourth studio album. The song was released as the group's final single in autumn 2004 to promote the group's compilation album Kleptomania. The single was released on 7" vinyl and Digital download only charting at #55 for one week on the UK Singles Chart.

Track listing

Personnel

Mansun
 Paul Draper – vocals, electric guitar, bass, keyboards
 Dominic Chad – backing vocals, electric guitar, bass, keyboards
 Andie Rathbone – drums, percussion

Production
 Richard Rainey – producer
 Paul Draper – producer, mixing ("Slipping Away")
 Cenzo Townshend - engineer, mixing ("Getting Your Way")
 Traffic - design

Chart positions

References

2004 singles
2004 songs
Mansun songs
Songs written by Paul Draper (musician)
Parlophone singles